Emerson Floyd Martin (born May 6, 1970) is a retired American football player who played two game with the Carolina Panthers of the National Football League (NFL) during the team's expansion year of 1995.

Martin was signed by the Panthers in January 1995. Martin played at guard for two games in 1995, earning one start. He was released in October 1995. Martin later played with the Mobile Admirals in the short-lived Regional Football League in 1999.

After his playing career, Martin moved into coaching, landing his first job with the AFL Carolina Cobras. Emerson later moved into college football where he is well-known for coaching offensive and defensive linemen. Martin is known for his dynamic recruiting abilities, believes in recruiting athletes he can develop into rising stars, and building relationships with alumni, boosters, and parents. Many of the nation's top college programs recruit athletes from Emerson program Players 2 Pros, LLC. Martin has developed and placed several athletes in Division 1 (FBS), Division 1 (FCS) and Division II.

Martin had built a well-respected program at Village Christian Academy in Fayetteville, North Carolina, before the program was shut down due to accusations of recruiting by the institution. Martin built a championship program in two years at the private institution leading the program to two straight state championship appearances back to back. After Emerson was terminated from Village Christian he later went to the Indianapolis Colts as a Bill Walsh intern.

Coaching experience
 AFL Carolina Cobras, assistant football coach, Raleigh, NC
 East Bladen High School, assistant football coach,  Elizabethtown, NC
 Saint Augustine University, assistant football coach, Raleigh, NC
 Athens Drive High School, Raleigh, NC
 CEO, Players 2 Pros, LLC, Raleigh, NC (www.players2pro.com)
 Village Christian Academy, Fayetteville, NC (head football coach)
 Indianapolis Colts – Bill Walsh intern

National Football League (NFL) offensive lineman
 1995-1999 Pittsburgh Steelers
 1997-1998 – NFL Europe Pittsburgh Steelers (Linemen of the Year)
 1995 – Carolina Panthers
 1994 – Kansas City Chiefs

Achievements
 All CIAA first-team 1992, 1993
 Black College All-American 1992, 1993
 Little College All-American 1992, 1993
 Associated Press Division II All-American 1992, 1993
 Kodak All-American 1993
 NFL Coaching Intern Programs

References

1970 births
Living people
American football offensive guards
Carolina Panthers players
Hampton Pirates football players
People from Elizabethtown, North Carolina
Players of American football from North Carolina
African-American players of American football
Regional Football League players
21st-century African-American sportspeople
20th-century African-American sportspeople
Pittsburgh Steelers players